Delturus parahybae is a species of armored catfish endemic found in the Paraíba do Sul River basin, Brazil.

References

Loricariidae
Catfish of South America
Fish of Brazil
Endemic fauna of Brazil
Taxa named by Rosa Smith Eigenmann
Taxa named by Carl H. Eigenmann
Fish described in 1889